Vərəzət (also, Verezet) is a village and municipality in the Shaki Rayon of Azerbaijan.  It has a population of 1,609.

References 

located in the 10th kilometers of Sheki oguz way.

Populated places in Shaki District